Kafr Amim, Idlib  is a Syrian village located in Saraqib Nahiyah in Idlib District, Idlib.  According to the Syria Central Bureau of Statistics (CBS), Kafr Amim, Idlib had a population of 3645 in the 2004 census.

References 

Populated places in Idlib District